Chronoclast (Selected Essays on Time-Reckoning and Auto-Cannibalism) is the third album by Canadian band Buried Inside. It is a concept album about time and how it controls people. The booklet contains numerous quotes about time, from fiction and non fiction works. The lyrics themselves are also highly allusive; for example, the last lines of "Time as Commodity" paraphrase a quote by Eugene Debs.

Track listing

Personnel 
Mike Godbout – drums
Martias Palacios-Hardy – Guitar, Artwork, Photography      
Steve Martin – Bass guitar, vocals
Nick Shaw – vocals
Andrew Tweedy - Guitar, vocals, Piano
Matt Bayles - Mixing, Organ (guest)
Mitch Ethier - Vocals (guest)
Mark Molanr - Cello, Viola, Violin (guest)
Mark Sullivan - Trumpet (guest)
Jake Von Wurden - Upright Bass (guest)
Alan Douches - Mastering
Justin Boardbent - Photography

See also 
Chronoclasm

References

2005 albums
Buried Inside albums
Relapse Records albums